Mobile phone tracking is a process for identifying the location of a mobile phone, whether stationary or moving. Localization may be effected by a number of technologies, such as the multilateration of radio signals between (several) cell towers of the network and the phone or by simply using GNSS. To locate a mobile phone using multilateration of mobile radio signals, the phone must emit at least the idle signal to contact nearby antenna towers and does not require an active call. The Global System for Mobile Communications (GSM) is based on the phone's signal strength to nearby antenna masts.

Mobile positioning may be used for location-based services that disclose the actual coordinates of a mobile phone. Telecommunication companies use this to approximate the location of a mobile phone, and thereby also its user.

Technology 

The location of a mobile phone can be determined in a number of ways.

Network-based 

The location of a mobile phone can be determined using the service provider's network infrastructure. The advantage of network-based techniques, from a service provider's point of view, is that they can be implemented non-intrusively without affecting handsets. Network-based techniques were developed many years prior to the widespread availability of GPS on handsets. (See  for one of the first works relating to this.)

The technology of locating is based on measuring power levels and antenna patterns and uses the concept that a powered mobile phone always communicates wirelessly with one of the closest base stations, so knowledge of the location of the base station implies the cell phone is nearby.

Advanced systems determine the sector in which the mobile phone is located and roughly estimate also the distance to the base station. Further approximation can be done by interpolating signals between adjacent antenna towers. Qualified services may achieve a precision of down to 50 meters in urban areas where mobile traffic and density of antenna towers (base stations) is sufficiently high. Rural and desolate areas may see miles between base stations and therefore determine locations less precisely.

GSM localization uses multilateration to determine the location of GSM mobile phones, or dedicated trackers, usually with the intent to locate the user.

The accuracy of network-based techniques varies, with cell identification being the least accurate (due to differential signals transposing between towers, otherwise known as "bouncing signals") and triangulation as moderately accurate, and newer "advanced forward link trilateration" timing methods as the most accurate. The accuracy of network-based techniques is both dependent on the concentration of cell base stations, with urban environments achieving the highest possible accuracy because of the higher number of cell towers, and the implementation of the most current timing methods.

One of the key challenges of network-based techniques is the requirement to work closely with the service provider, as it entails the installation of hardware and software within the operator's infrastructure. Frequently the compulsion associated with a legislative framework, such as Enhanced 9-1-1, is required before a service provider will deploy a solution.

In December 2020, it emerged that the Israeli surveillance company Rayzone Group may have gained access, in 2018, to the SS7 signaling system via cellular network provider Sure Guernsey, thereby being able to track the location of any cellphone globally.

Handset-based
The location of a mobile phone can be determined using client software installed on the handset. This technique determines the location of the handset by putting its location by cell identification, signal strengths of the home and neighboring cells, which is continuously sent to the carrier. In addition, if the handset is also equipped with GPS then significantly more precise location information can be then sent from the handset to the carrier.

Another approach is to use a fingerprinting-based technique, where the "signature" of the home and neighboring cells signal strengths at different points in the area of interest is recorded by war-driving and matched in real-time to determine the handset location. This is usually performed independent from the carrier.

The key disadvantage of handset-based techniques, from service provider's point of view, is the necessity of installing software on the handset. It requires the active cooperation of the mobile subscriber as well as software that must be able to handle the different operating systems of the handsets. Typically, smartphones, such as one based on Symbian, Windows Mobile, Windows Phone, BlackBerry OS, iOS, or Android, would be able to run such software, e.g. Google Maps.

One proposed work-around is the installation of embedded hardware or software on the handset by the manufacturers, e.g., Enhanced Observed Time Difference (E-OTD). This avenue has not made significant headway, due to the difficulty of convincing different manufacturers to cooperate on a common mechanism and to address the cost issue. Another difficulty would be to address the issue of foreign handsets that are roaming in the network.

SIM-based
Using the subscriber identity module (SIM) in GSM and Universal Mobile Telecommunications System (UMTS) handsets, it is possible to obtain raw radio measurements from the handset. Available measurements include the serving Cell ID, round-trip time, and signal strength. The type of information obtained via the SIM can differ from that which is available from the handset. For example, it may not be possible to obtain any raw measurements from the handset directly, yet still obtain measurements via the SIM.

Wi-Fi
Crowdsourced Wi-Fi data can also be used to identify a handset's location. The poor performance of the GPS-based methods in indoor environment and the increasing popularity of Wi-Fi have encouraged companies to design new and feasible methods to carry out Wi-Fi-based indoor positioning. Most smartphones combine Global Navigation Satellite Systems (GNSS), such as GPS and GLONASS, with Wi-Fi positioning systems.

Hybrid positioning system 
Hybrid positioning systems use a combination of network-based and handset-based technologies for location determination. One example would be some modes of Assisted GPS, which can both use GPS and network information to compute the location. Both types of data are thus used by the telephone to make the location more accurate (i.e., A-GPS). Alternatively tracking with both systems can also occur by having the phone attain its GPS-location directly from the satellites, and then having the information sent via the network to the person that is trying to locate the telephone. Such systems include Google Maps, as well as, LTE's OTDOA and E-CellID.

There are also hybrid positioning systems which combine several different location approaches to position mobile devices by Wi-Fi, WiMAX, GSM, LTE, IP addresses, and network environment data.

Operational purpose 
In order to route calls to a phone, cell towers listen for a signal sent from the phone and negotiate which tower is best able to communicate with the phone. As the phone changes location, the antenna towers monitor the signal, and the phone is "roamed" to an adjacent tower as appropriate. By comparing the relative signal strength from multiple antenna towers, a general location of a phone can be roughly determined. Other means make use of the antenna pattern, which supports angular determination and phase discrimination.

Newer phones may also allow the tracking of the phone even when turned on but not active in a telephone call. This results from the roaming procedures that perform hand-over of the phone from one base station to another.

Consumer applications 

A phone's location can be shared with friends and family, posted to a public website, recorded locally, or shared with other users of a smartphone app. The inclusion of GPS receivers on smartphones has made geographical apps nearly ubiquitous on these devices. Specific applications include:
 Geo-fence specific locations of interest such as No Fly Zones
 GPS navigation and maps
 Locator apps like Find My Friends
 Dating apps like Grindr
 Recording a journey, for example to show a hiking accomplishment
 For quantified self purposes such as fitness tracking
 GPS drawing

In January 2019, the location of her iPhone as determined by her sister helped Boston police find kidnapping victim Olivia Ambrose.

Privacy 
Locating or positioning touches upon delicate privacy issues, since it enables someone to check where a person is without the person's consent. Strict ethics and security measures are strongly recommended for services that employ positioning.
In 2012 Malte Spitz held a TED talk on the issue of mobile phone privacy in which he showcased his own stored data that he received from Deutsche Telekom after suing the company. He described the data, which consists of 35,830 lines of data collected during the span of Germany's data retention at the time, saying, "This is six months of my life [...] You can see where I am, when I sleep at night, what I'm doing." He partnered up with ZEIT Online and made his information publicly available in an interactive map which allows users to watch his entire movements during that time in fast-forward. Spitz concluded that technology consumers are the key to challenging privacy norms in today's society who "have to fight for self determination in the digital age."

China
The Chinese government has proposed using this technology to track commuting patterns of Beijing city residents. Aggregate presence of mobile phone users could be tracked in a privacy-preserving fashion. This location data was used to locate protesters during protests in Beijing in 2022.

Europe
In Europe most countries have a constitutional guarantee on the secrecy of correspondence, and location data obtained from mobile phone networks is usually given the same protection as the communication itself.

United States
In the United States, there is a limited constitutional guarantee on the privacy of telecommunications through the Fourth Amendment. The use of location data is further limited by statutory, administrative, and case law. Police access of seven days of a citizen's location data is unquestionably enough to be a fourth amendment search requiring both probable cause and a warrant.

In November 2017, the United States Supreme Court ruled in Carpenter v. United States that the government violates the Fourth Amendment by accessing historical records containing the physical locations of cellphones without a search warrant.

See also 

 Carpenter v. United States
 Cellphone surveillance
 Geolocation
 GLONASS Russian "Global Navigation Satellite System"
 Google Latitude
 GPS phone
 Indoor positioning
 Information privacy
 IMEI number
 Local positioning system
 Mass surveillance
 Mobile dating
 Mobile device forensics
 Mobile identification number
 Mobile phone tracking
 Mobile security
 Positioning technology
 Phone surveillance
 Radio resource location services protocol
 Real-time locating system
 Riley v. California
 Satellite navigation
 Secure telephone
 United States v. Jones (2012)
 United States v. Karo
 Vehicle tracking system
 5G phone tracking vulnerabilities

References

External links
 
 

GSM standard
Mobile technology
Crime prevention
Criminal investigation
Espionage techniques
Mobile telecommunication services
Privacy
Geopositioning